Jack Spong (born 4 February 2002) is an English footballer who plays as a midfielder for Crawley Town, on loan from Brighton & Hove Albion of the Premier League.

Career

Brighton & Hove Albion
Spong made his professional debut for Brighton & Hove Albion, on 25 September 2019 in a 3–1 defeat at home against Aston Villa in the EFL Cup.

Crawley Town (loan)
On 31 January 2023, Spong joined fellow Sussex side Crawley Town of League Two on loan for the remainder of the season. He made his first league appearance of his professional career on his Crawley Town debut, coming on as a 89th minute substitute in the 1–0 away loss at Leyton Orient on 18 February.

Career statistics

References

2002 births
Living people
English footballers
Association football midfielders
Brighton & Hove Albion F.C. players
Crawley Town F.C. players